Tom Dosch is an American football coach and former player.  He served as the head football coach at Jamestown College from 2004 to 2007 and  Northern State University, from 2010 to 2019.  Dosch was the inside linebackers coach and special teams coordinator at Southern Illinois University Carbondale in 2008 and 2009.

Coaching career
Dosch was the head football coach at University of Jamestown in Jamestown, North Dakota for four seasons, from 2004 until 2007.  His coaching record at Jamestown was 25–17.

Dosch was named Northern Sun Intercollegiate Conference Football Coach of the Year Following Northern State's 8–3 season in 2014. The 8–3 record was the best finish for Northern State football since 1999. Dosch took over at Northern State following a 2–9 record in 2009.

Head coaching record

References

Year of birth missing (living people)
Living people
Dickinson State Blue Hawks football coaches
Dickinson State Blue Hawks football players
Jamestown Jimmies football coaches
North Dakota Fighting Hawks football coaches
Northern State Wolves football coaches
Southern Illinois Salukis football coaches
High school football coaches in North Dakota
University of North Dakota alumni